The 2015 NRL season consisted of 26 weekly regular season rounds starting on Thursday March 5, and concluded on Sunday October 4 with the Grand Final.

Regular season

Round 1

Total Attendance: 142,301
Average Attendance: 17,788

Round 2

Total Attendance:114,389 
Average Attendance: 14,299

Round 3

Total Attendance: 130,354
Average Attendance: 16,294

Round 4

Total Attendance: 113,311 Average Attendance: 14,164

Round 5

Total Attendance: 150,754  Average Attendance: 18,844

Round 6

Total Attendance:126,449 Average Attendance: 15,806

Round 7

 The Cronulla Sharks vs South Sydney game, played in notorious conditions as a result of an East coast low drew the lowest NRL crowd to a premiership game since 1999.

Round 8

Total Attendance:154,108 Average Attendance: 19,264

Round 9
 Total Attendance: 111,526 Average Attendance: 14,134

Round 10

Round 11

Round 12

Round 13

Round 14

Round 15

Round 16

Round 17

Round 18

Round 19

Round 20

Round 21

Round 22

Round 23

Round 24

Round 25

Round 26

Finals series

Qualifying and Elimination Finals
1st Qualifying Final

1st Elimination Final

2nd Qualifying Final

2nd Elimination Final

Semi finals
1st Semi Final

2nd Semi Final

Preliminary Finals
1st Preliminary Final

2nd Preliminary Final

Grand final

References

National Rugby League season results
Results